Görlitzer Park (nicknamed "Görli") is a major park and recreation area in the Kreuzberg district of Berlin. The 14-hectare park area contains, among other things, a petting zoo, several sports and football fields, and a small lake. At its north-west end is the Görlitzer Bahnhof U-Bahn station.

History 

The original Görlitzer Bahnhof (named after the Saxon town of Görlitz) suffered heavy damage during the Battle of Berlin. The last passenger train services to operate through the station ended on April 29, 1951. Demolition of the site took place on 24 October 1962, at the behest of former Berlin Senator, Rolf Schwedler (SPD), despite protests by many residents.

In the postwar period, the site was used as a coal depot. Until 1985, freight trains still operated through the Görlitzer Bahnhof train lines, supplying nearby storage sheds and a junkyard on the station grounds. During the division of Berlin, a border crossing was erected on the bridge over the Landwehr canal to control the passage of these freight trains. The remains of this border crossing are still visible today, as are a short piece of track to the east of the canal bridge and two former freight sheds still remain from the former station.

Görlitzer Park is widely known as a hotspot for purchasing cannabis.

Park conception 
In the early 1980s, a civil and squatter movement began pushing for the creation of a "Görlitzer City Park" on the site of the old Bahnhof. In the spring of 1983, a program of "greening" of the area was scheduled:

At this time, the soil at the site of a former scrap metal compactor was heavily contaminated with oil and needed to be replaced, and an area of the future park was still being used as a coal depot. However, the Reichsbahn management proved to be supportive of the park plans and "Cheerfully developed a children's petting zoo on the southern track. Material and feed donations from surrounding industries flowed in abundantly, and bulldozers from a local cement plant came by occasionally to donate topsoil. Only the money to lease the land was still lacking.

Final approval from the Environment and Finance Senators was still pending at that time.

Children's playground 
According to the Südost Express, "the district office of Kreuzberg had already rented the 4000 square meter site," by 1979, as part of the initiative by Verein SO 36, a local civic group. However, the building authorities wanted to use the site to construct a Spreewald-Bad swimming pool complex. "More than 1000 signatures have been collected so far for this playground. [...] (After negotiations) the district office will seek to find a solution that makes both the building project and a children's playground possible on the Görlitzer Bahnhof site."

The park today 

At the end of the 1980s, a district park was built on the former railway site to the plans of the Freie Planungsgruppe Berlin. Today, only remnants of tracks, the pedestrian tunnel, the former enclosure wall, and three freight sheds exist of the former station.

In the south of the present park, several railway bridges connected the station area with the district of Treptow, one of which is still preserved, that leads pedestrians over the Landwehr Canal. A green corridor on the former railway line runs parallel to Kiefholzstraße and deep into Alt-Treptow so that cyclists and pedestrians can access Treptower Park through Görlitzer Park. Until the fall of the Wall, the Berlin Wall ran along the Landwehr Canal. Also, in the southern part of the area, in the corner formed by Görlitzer Ufer and Wiener Straße, a railroad wheelhouse used to exist. Today, there is a hill with a slide and an  toboggan run. The park borders Wrangelkiez on the north/northeastern side.

The Görlitzer Tunnel was still walkable until at least the end of 1989, the removal of which gave the park a large hollow in the middle, which forms a kind of natural arena. The former walls of the tunnel were included as a design element and are still recognizable today. On the west side of the basin is a  steel-beam sculpture, Schreitender Mensch, by Rüdiger Preisler.

Location 
The park is bounded to the northwest by Spreewaldplatz, the former station forecourt which now houses the Wellenbad am Spreewaldplatz swimming pool complex. The swimming pool complex was built between 1984 and 1987 according to plans by architect Christoph Langhof. They are separated from the park by the viaduct of the Berlin U-Bahn lines U1 & U3 along Skalitzer Straße. In the south, the area borders the Landwehr Canal and the district of Alt-Treptow.

Former Pamukkale Fountain and plans for redesigning the park 

The Pamukkale fountain, created by the sculptor Wigand Witting from 1994 to 1997 and completed in 1998, was one of the main design elements in Görlitzer Park. It was inspired by the travertine terraces of Pamukkale, Turkey and became a special place of remembrance for the many citizens of Kreuzberg with Turkish ancestry. Due to a faulty substructure and lack of drainage for the foundations, as well as problems with the Portuguese limestone used, the construction was so badly damaged by its first winter that it had to be closed to visitors for security reasons. For a long time, there was a dispute over the restoration. In October 2000, the artist was sentenced to pay damages in the amount of 1.1 million euros. This sentence was confirmed again in November 2008. In autumn 2009, the crumbled fountain construction was removed along with the sculptures that were still intact at the time. The demolition was not without controversy, and led to demonstrations. Unknown activists poured large amounts of red paint down the terraced landscape as a sign of the bleeding out of a significant work of art for the integration and diversity of Berlin's cultures.

The remaining concrete terraces were laid out with artificial turf and now are used for seating.

After the demolition of the fountain and the dissatisfaction of many park visitors with the condition of the park, the district office of Friedrichshain-Kreuzberg organized an "ideas workshop" in 2009 to beautify the park.

The orchard 
Since 2011, in the middle of the park, an orchard with apple, pear and greengage trees was created. In total, there were 26 trees after the third planting in early April 2013. As a memorial to deceased Kreuzberg actor Eralp Uzun, family and friends planted another tree in the meadow in May 2013.

This orchard was created by the Kiezwandlern, a local Transition Town group, with the support of the district's green area office. Committed residents habitually cultivate the orchard meadow. The later harvest from the trees is available to the public.

Drug trafficking 
Görlitzer Park is one of the largest drug transfer centers in Berlin. The park has been the site of multiple violent incidents resulting in injuries and even death. The drug dealing originated in parts of the park during the 2000s. Since May 2012, the park area has been subject to constant police patrols. The problems, however, have remained.

In November 2014, the "Task Force Görlitzer Park" was established to curb drug-related crime around Görlitzer Park. This task force consisted of the Berlin Police, the public prosecutor's office, the administration of justice, the immigration office, and the Friedrichshain-Kreuzberg district office. The task force effected several changes to Görlitzer Park, such as removing hedges and shrubs that could serve as drug stashes, as well as greatly increasing the police presence.

Interior Senator Frank Henkel introduced a zero tolerance rule in March 2015 which enabled the police to prosecute consumers and dealers for small amounts of drugs. However, this did not eliminate the drug problem, instead causing many drug dealers to move to other streets, parks and neighborhoods.

References

External links
 

Friedrichshain-Kreuzberg
Parks in Berlin